DXDE (100.7 FM) is a radio station owned by Rizal Memorial Colleges Broadcasting Corporation and operated by Y2H Broadcasting Network, Inc. It serves as a relay station of 97.9 XFM in Davao. Its satellite office and transmitter are located at the 2nd floor, AMG Bldg., Villa Magsanoc Subd., National Highway, Brgy. Mankilam, Tagum.

History
The station was established on March 15, 2014 as One Radio under the Radyo ni Juan network. At that time, it was located at Purok Bautista, Brgy. Mankilam. In December 2, 2020, it, along with the other Radyo ni Juan stations, went off the air due to financial problems.

On March 1, 2022, the station went back on air, this time as XFM under the management of Dr. Remelito Uy's Y2H Broadcasting Network. It moved to its present location in Villa Magsanoc Subdivision at the same barangay. It was initially an originating station until October 4, 2022, when it transferred its studios to Davao City. As a result, it was downgraded to a relay station of XFM Davao.

References

Radio stations in Davao del Norte
Radio stations established in 2014